Merlin engine may refer to:
Rolls-Royce Merlin, an aircraft engine
Merlin (rocket engine family), family of rocket engines manufactured by SpaceX
 Merlin, an engine in Thomas and Friends